The Tunisian Open was a men's professional golf tournament which was part of the European Tour's official schedule from 1982 to 1985. It was the European Tour's first venture outside Europe. The Moroccan Open was also on the Tour's schedule for a time, but since 2001 the tour has departed from North Africa to focus its international expansion on the established golf markets of Australasia and South Africa and the rapidly emerging Asian market. In 1985 the prize fund was £70,000, which was the third smallest in a European Tour official money event that season. In 2015 and 2016, it featured on the Alps Tour's schedule.

Winners

Notes

External links
Coverage on the European Tour's official site

Former European Tour events
Golf tournaments in Tunisia
Recurring sporting events established in 1982
Recurring events disestablished in 1985
Defunct sports competitions in Tunisia